The Alexandria Confectionary & Chocolate Company (known as Corona), established under the name of the Royal Chocolate Works of Egypt  in 1919 by Tommy Christou, is the oldest confectionery and chocolate company in the Egyptian market.

After the 1952 coup d'état, the company became a public sector company in 1963 through the process of nationalization by which the revolution's government took over almost all of the private companies and personally owned assets. In 2000, the company was privatized again when it was sold to Samcrete Egypt.

References

External links
 Official website

Chocolate companies
Food and drink companies established in 1919
Food companies of Egypt
Egyptian brands
Companies based in Alexandria